The 2015 Atlantic Coast Conference football season was the 63rd season of college football play for the Atlantic Coast Conference (ACC).  It was played from September 2015 to January 2016. The Atlantic Coast Conference consisted of 14 members in two divisions. The Atlantic Division consisted of Boston College, Clemson, Florida State, Louisville, North Carolina State, Syracuse, and Wake Forest. The Coastal Division consisted of Duke, Georgia Tech, Miami, North Carolina, Pittsburgh, Virginia, and Virginia Tech.  The division champions, Clemson and North Carolina, met on December 5 in the 2015 ACC Championship Game, in Charlotte, North Carolina at Bank of America Stadium.

Preseason

Preseason Poll
The 2015 ACC Preseason Poll was announced at the ACC Football Kickoff meetings in Pinehurst, North Carolina on July 19–21. Georgia Tech was voted to win Coastal division while Clemson was voted to win the Atlantic division and the conference. Deshaun Watson of Clemson was voted the Preseason ACC Player of the Year.

Atlantic Division poll
 Clemson – 1,032 (101 first place votes)
 Florida State – 992 (56)
 Louisville – 746 (1)
 North Carolina State - 673
 Boston College – 473
 Syracuse – 291
 Wake Forest – 217

Coastal Division poll
 Georgia Tech – 991 (96)
 Virginia Tech – 841 (44)
 Miami – 632 (7)
 Duke – 615 (4)
 North Carolina – 590 (4)
 Pittsburgh - 535 (3)
 Virginia – 220

Predicted ACC Championship Game Winner
 Clemson – 84
 Florida State – 41
 Georgia Tech - 20
 Virginia Tech - 7
 North Carolina - 3
 Miami - 2
 NC State - 1

Preseason ACC Player of the Year
 Deshaun Watson, CLEM - 69
 James Conner, PITT - 16
 Justin Thomas, GT - 13
 Jalen Ramsey, FSU - 7
 Brad Kaaya, MIA - 7
 Marquise Williams, UNC - 6
 Kendall Fuller, VT - 6
 Tyler Boyd, PITT - 3
 Jacoby Brissett, NCST - 1

Preseason All Conference Teams

Offense

Defense

Specialist

Coaches

Only one team changed head coaches for the 2015 season. Pat Narduzzi was selected as Pittsburgh's fifth head coach since 2010 following the resignation of former coach Paul Chryst.  Chryst accepted the head coaching job at Wisconsin on December 17, 2014 leaving the vacancy for Pittsburgh to fill.  This will be Narduzzi's first head coaching job at the collegiate level.  He has, however, been regarded as one of the best assistant coaches in college football, winning the 2013 Broyles Award.  He was most recently the defensive coordinator at Michigan State.

Note: Stats shown are before the beginning of the season

Al Golden Firing

On October 25, Miami athletic director Blake James fired head coach Al Golden, just over halfway through the season. The firing came after a 58-0 loss to Clemson, the worst loss in program history. Throughout the season, parts of the Miami fan base, and even former players, had been very vocal in calling for a head coaching change. In each home game, and even a game at Cincinnati, planes had been hired to fly banners over the stadium on gameday reading "Fire Al Golden".  The tight ends coach, Larry Scott, took over interim head coaching duties for the remainder of the season.

Rankings

Bowl Games

* Rankings based on CFP rankings

Postseason

All-conference teams
The following player were selected to the All-ACC teams for 2015.

First Team

Second Team

Third Team

^ indicates that there was a tie in the voting

ACC Individual Awards

ACC Player of the Year
QB Deshaun Watson - Clemson

Rookie of the Year
S Jordan Whitehead - Pittsburgh

Coach of the Year
Dabo Swinney - Clemson

Offensive Player of the Year
QB Deshaun Watson - Clemson

Offensive Rookie of the Year
QB Qadree Ollison - Miami

Jacobs Blocking Trophy
T Roderick Johnson - Florida State

Defensive Player of the Year
S Jeremy Cash - Duke

Defensive Rookie of the Year
S Jordan Whitehead - Pittsburgh

National Awards

Davey O'Brien Award
QB Deshaun Watson - Clemson

Home Depot Coach of the Year Award
Walter Camp Coach of the Year Award
Associated Press College Football Coach of the Year Award
 Dabo Swinney - Clemson

Pop Warner College Football Award
LB Brandon Chubb - Wake Forest

References